Guy Favreau,   (May 20, 1917 – July 11, 1967) was a Canadian lawyer, politician and judge.

Born in Montreal, Quebec, the son of Léopold Favreau and Béatrice Gagnon, he obtained a Bachelor of Arts and an LL.B. from the Université de Montréal. He was called to the Bar of Quebec in 1940. He worked as a lawyer in Montreal from 1942 to 1952. In 1952, he became a member of the Restrictive Trade Practices Commission in Ottawa. In 1955, he became Assistant Deputy Minister of Justice. He helped to create the Faculty of Civil Law at the University of Ottawa and taught there as well. In 1960, he returned to Montreal to work as a private lawyer.

He was elected as a Liberal in the riding of Papineau in the 1963 election, and was re-elected in 1965. He was Minister of Citizenship and Immigration (1963–1964), Minister of Justice and Attorney General of Canada (1964–1965), President of the Privy Council (1965–1967), and Registrar General of Canada (1966–1967). As well, he was Leader of the Government in the House of Commons (1964) and Liberal Party House Leader (1964). Allegations regarding involvement in the prison escape of Lucien Rivard had led to his downfall as Attorney General.

He was appointed a judge of the Quebec Superior Court on April 17, 1967, but he died shortly afterward. He was entombed at the Notre Dame des Neiges Cemetery in Montreal.

The Complexe Guy-Favreau, the federal government's main building in Montreal, was built in 1983 and is named in his honour.

References

External links

 

1917 births
1967 deaths
French Quebecers
Judges in Quebec
Lawyers from Montreal
Liberal Party of Canada MPs
Members of the House of Commons of Canada from Quebec
Members of the King's Privy Council for Canada
Politicians from Montreal
Université de Montréal alumni
20th-century Canadian lawyers
Burials at Notre Dame des Neiges Cemetery